The Best of Morrissey is a 2001 compilation album by Morrissey.

Track listing
"The More You Ignore Me, the Closer I Get" – 3:43
"Suedehead" – 3:54
"Everyday Is Like Sunday" – 3:32
"Glamorous Glue" – 4:08
"Do Your Best and Don't Worry" – 4:07
"November Spawned a Monster" – 5:23
"The Last of the Famous International Playboys" – 3:39
"Sing Your Life" – 3:26
"Hairdresser on Fire" – 3:50
"Interesting Drug" – 3:27
"We Hate It When Our Friends Become Successful" – 2:30
"Certain People I Know" – 3:11
"Now My Heart Is Full" – 4:08
"I Know It's Gonna Happen Someday" – 4:22
"Sunny" – 2:41
"Alma Matters" – 4:48
"Hold on to Your Friends" – 4:04
"Sister I'm a Poet" – 2:25
"Disappointed" – 3:05
"Tomorrow" (radio remix) – 3:54
"Lost" – 3:54

Morrissey compilation albums
Rhino Records compilation albums
2001 greatest hits albums